Chthonerpeton perissodus is a species of caecilian in the family Typhlonectidae. It is endemic to Minas Gerais, Brazil, and only known from its imprecise type locality, Rio Pandeiro. Only three specimens are known. The common name Minas Gerais caecilian has been coined for this species.

Description
The type series consists of three specimens. There are 95–101 primary annuli (segments). The head is bluntly rounded. The eyes are dorsolaterally oriented and covered by epidermis. The coloration is relatively uniform, slate gray dorsally and slightly lighter ventrally. There are numerous whitish skin glands present throughout the body.

Habitat and conservation
The type locality of this species is imprecise, and there is no information on its habitat. Presumably, it is an aquatic species that reproduces through viviparity. Population status and threats it are unknown.

References

perissodus
Amphibians of Brazil
Endemic fauna of Brazil
Amphibians described in 1987
Taxonomy articles created by Polbot